John Joyce (1839 – 1 December 1899) was a Member of Parliament for Lyttelton and Akaroa in the South Island of New Zealand.

Early life

Joyce was born in Penzance, Cornwall in 1839. As a boy, he worked in the deep sea fishing industry. He was made the master of a schooner at age 19. In 1854, he emigrated to Victoria and worked for the Water Police in Williamstown, Melbourne. He emigrated to New Zealand in 1861, to work for the Water Police in Port Chalmers. He was appointed clerk in the magistrates' court, before joining the legal firm of Howorth and Hodgkins in Dunedin. Joyce was admitted a barrister and solicitor of the Supreme Court in 1873. He found a partner in Mr. J. A. D. Adams, and they set up the firm of Joyce and Adams.

He moved to Canterbury and started his own legal practice in 1879, with offices in Lyttelton and Sydenham. He was elected onto the Sydenham Borough Council and was the third mayor for the borough. Joyce moved to Lyttelton and was elected onto the Lyttelton Borough Council in 1885.

Member of Parliament

 
 
 
 

John Joyce represented Lyttelton (1887–1890; 1893–1899) and Akaroa (1890–93) in the New Zealand House of Representatives. He was a "staunch supporter of the Liberal Party".

Death and commemoration
Joyce died suddenly on 1 December 1899. He was in the midst of the 1899 general election campaign when he started to have heart problems. He saw a doctor in the morning, was prescribed rest, and died in the early evening during his sleep.

His funeral was described as one of the largest ever in the colony, and was attended by several thousand people. Due to his previous involvement with the Canterbury volunteer forces, he was given a full military funeral. The railways estimated that they transported 400 soldiers and about 2500 others to Lyttelton to the funeral.

Joyce was married in 1864 to a daughter of Mr. G. Coates (a jeweller from Christchurch), and he was survived by his wife, four sons and six daughters. Joyce Street in Lyttelton is named after him.

References

|- 

|-

1839 births
1899 deaths
New Zealand Liberal Party MPs
19th-century New Zealand lawyers
New Zealand people of English descent
New Zealand MPs for Christchurch electorates
Members of the New Zealand House of Representatives
Mayors of places in Canterbury, New Zealand
19th-century New Zealand politicians
People from Penzance
Lyttelton Harbour Board members